William Aurelius Clarke (November 18, 1868 – February 5, 1940) was a merchant and political figure in Ontario, Canada. He represented Wellington North in the House of Commons of Canada from 1911 to 1921 as a Conservative.

He was born in Arthur, Ontario, the son of William Clarke and Margaret Dryden. Clarke entered business as a merchant in Palmerston. In 1893, he married S. Johnston. Clarke ran unsuccessfully for a seat in the House of Commons in 1908. He was a Unionist Party member from 1917 to 1921. Clarke was defeated when he ran for reelection in 1921. He died in Palmerston at the age of 71.

References

Members of the House of Commons of Canada from Ontario
Unionist Party (Canada) MPs
Conservative Party of Canada (1867–1942) MPs
1868 births
1940 deaths